Fossil Butte National Monument is a United States National Monument managed by the National Park Service, located  west of Kemmerer, Wyoming, United States. It centers on an assemblage of Eocene Epoch (56 to 34 million years ago) animal and plant fossils associated with Fossil Lake—the smallest lake of the three great lakes which were then present in what are now Wyoming, Utah, and Colorado. The other two lakes were Lake Gosiute and Lake Uinta. Fossil Butte National Monument was established as a national monument on October 23, 1972.

Fossil Butte National Monument preserves the best paleontological record of Cenozoic aquatic communities in North America and possibly the world, within the 50-million-year-old Green River Formation — the ancient lake bed. Fossils preserved include fish, alligators, bats, turtles, a dog-sized horse, insects, and many other species of plants and animals — suggest that the region was a low, subtropical, freshwater basin when the sediments accumulated, over about a 2 million-year period.

Geologic formations

During the Eocene this portion of Wyoming was a sub-tropical lake ecosystem. The Green River Lake System contained three ancient lakes, Fossil Lake, Lake Gosiute, and Lake Uinta. These lakes covered parts of southwest Wyoming, northeast Utah and northwestern Colorado. Fossil Butte is a remnant of the deposits from Fossil Lake. Over the two million years that it existed, the lake varied in length and width.

Fossil Buttes National Monument contains only 13 square miles of the 900-square-mile ancient lake. The ancient lake sediments that form the primary fossil digs is referred to as the Green River Formation. In addition to this fossil-bearing strata, a large portion of the Wasatch Formation, river and stream sediments, is within the national monument. The Wasatch Formation represents the shoreline ecosystem around the lake and contains fossil teeth and bone fragments of Eocene mammals.  Among these are early primates and horses.

History
Coal mining for the railroad led to the settlement of the nearby town of Fossil, Wyoming. When the fossils were discovered, miners dug them up to sell to collectors. In particular, Lee Craig sold fossils from 1897 to 1937. Commercial fossil collecting is not allowed within the National Monument, but numerous quarries on private land nearby continue to produce extraordinary fossil specimens, both for museums and for private collectors.

Exhibits
The Fossil Butte National Monument Visitor Center features over 80 fossils and fossil casts on exhibit, including fish, a crocodile, turtle, bats, birds, insects and plants.  A 13-minute video is shown about the fossils found at the site and what scientists have learned.  Interactive exhibits let visitors create fossil rubbings to take home, and a computer program discusses fossils, geology and the current natural history of the monument.

Activities
During the summer, lab personnel prepare fossils in public.  Summer activities also include ranger programs, hikes, paleontology and geology talks, and participation in fossil quarry collections for the park. 

A Junior Ranger program can be completed by children aged 5–12 (with exercises scaled to the child's age) in 3–4 hours.  A highlight is hiking 3/4 mile up the butte to the dig, where interns from the Geological Society of America talk about their excavation and let children help them flake apart sedimentary deposits to discover fish fossils and coprolites.

List of fossil species recovered at Fossil Butte National Monument

Fish:
Asterotrygon spp, an extinct stingray
Diplomystus dentatus, an extinct ray-finned fish
Knightia spp, an extinct fish related to herring and sardines
Seven extinct species of perch
Heliobatis radians, an extinct stingray
Notogoneus spp, an extinct bottom-feeding fish
Crossopholis magnicaudatus (Commons), a 1-meter (40 inches) long predatory paddlefish
Asineops squamifrons, called 'mystery fish'- allocated its own family Asineopidae
Two extinct species of the family Osteoglossidae
Amphiplaga brachyptera, an extinct freshwater fish
Two extinct species of the genus Hiodon

Amphibians:

 Aleoamphiuma tetradactylum, an extinct omnivorous salamander
 Aerugoamnis paulus, an extinct frog

Mammals:

Coryphodon 
Onychonycteris finneyi and Icaronycteris index, bats
Heptodon, an extinct tapir
Apatemys chardini, a tree-dwelling mammal similar to the lemur
Protorohippus, an early horse-like mammal
Palaeosinopa didelphoides, an otter-like carnivore
Hyopsodus wortmani 'tube sheep', a small omnivore
L. popoagicum, an extinct odd-toed ungulate

Birds:
Frigate birds
Pseudocrypturus cercanaxius, an extinct shoreline bird
Gallinuloides wyomingesis, an extinct land fowl
Primobucco mcgrewi, an extinct roller bird
Four extinct species of parrot- Cyrillavis coldurnorum, Cyrillavis olsoni, Avolatavis tenens and Tynskya eocaena

Reptiles:
Afairiguana, an extinct anole
Boavus idelmani, a small extinct snake
Bahndwivici, Afairiguana avius and Bahndwivici ammoskius, extinct lizards
Baptemys wyomingenis, an extinct river turtle
Echmatemys wyomingensis, an extinct pond turtle
Borealosuchus wilsoni and Tsoabichi greenriverenis, extinct crocodiles
Three species of soft-shell turtles- Apalone heteroglypta, Axestemys byssinus and Hummelichelys guttata
Baenidae, turtle
Plants:
Palm trees
Cattails
Gyrocarpus spp
Lagokarpos Lacustris, a type of distinct 'winged fruit' plant Lagokarpos found in lake deposits
Ailanthus confucii
Platycerium, a staghorn fern
Salvinia preauriculata, a water fern
Lygodium kaulfussi 'climbing fern'
Nelumbo spp
Chaneya tenuis; a genus of uncertain affinities
Birthwort (species unknown)
Soapberry
Species similar to a walnut

Arthropods:

 Bechleja rostrata, an extinct species of shrimp
 Procambarus primaevus, an extinct species of crayfish
 Three unidentified species of spider
 Dragonflies
 Damselflies
 Crickets
 Other insects including bees and ants

Primary source:

Gallery

See also
Dinosaur National Monument, Colorado, Utah
List of national monuments of the United States
Other NPS Cenozoic Era sites in the western U.S.:
John Day Fossil Beds National Monument, Oregon
Hagerman Fossil Beds National Monument, Idaho
Agate Fossil Beds National Monument, Nebraska
Badlands National Park, South Dakota
Florissant Fossil Beds National Monument, Colorado

References

External links 

 National Park Service: official Fossil Butte National Monument website
Photo Gallery of Green River Formation Fossils from FBNM
 Photo tour of FBNM, from USGS
 Paleontology of Green River fossils, from University of California, Berkeley
 Geologic travel guide from American Geological Institute

National Park Service National Monuments in Wyoming
Eocene
Fossil parks in the United States
Protected areas of Lincoln County, Wyoming
Natural history museums in Wyoming
Museums in Lincoln County, Wyoming
Protected areas established in 1972
Paleontology in Wyoming
Paleontological protected areas in the United States
1972 establishments in Wyoming
1972 in paleontology